The United States District Court for the District of Connecticut (in case citations, D. Conn.)  is the federal district court whose jurisdiction is the state of Connecticut. The court has offices in Bridgeport, Hartford, and New Haven. Appeals from the court are heard by the United States Court of Appeals for the Second Circuit. It was one of the original 13 courts established by the Judiciary Act of 1789, 1 Stat. 73, on September 24, 1789. The Court initially had a single judge, and remained so composed until March 3, 1927, when a second judge was added by 1927 44 Stat. 1348. Six additional judgeships were created between 1961 and 1990 to bring about the current total of eight judges. Court offices at Hartford and New Haven are located in the Abraham A. Ribicoff Federal Building and the Richard C. Lee United States Courthouse.

Cases decided by the District of Connecticut are appealed to the United States Court of Appeals for the Second Circuit (except for patent claims and claims against the U.S. government under the Tucker Act, which are appealed to the Federal Circuit).

The United States Attorney's Office for the District of Connecticut represents the United States in civil and criminal litigation in the court.  the United States Attorney is Vanessa R. Avery.

The United States Marshal for the District of Connecticut is Lawrence Bobnick.

Current judges 

:

Vacancies and pending nominations

Former judges

Chief judges

Succession of seats

List of U.S. Attorneys

See also 

 Courts of Connecticut
 List of current United States district judges
 List of United States federal courthouses in Connecticut

Notes

External links 
 United States District Court for the District of Connecticut Official Website
 United States Attorney for the District of Connecticut Official Website

Connecticut
Connecticut law
Bridgeport, Connecticut
Hartford, Connecticut
New Haven, Connecticut
1789 establishments in Connecticut
Courts and tribunals established in 1789